Robert M. Hill Jr. (born April 16, 1932) is an American politician who served in the Alabama House of Representatives from 1966 to 1978.

Politics
He served in the Alabama House of Representatives from November 1966 to November 1978.

References

Alabama Democrats
Living people
1932 births